Christopher Eubanks was the defending champion but lost in the second round to Liam Broady.

Blaž Rola won the title after defeating Broady 6–4, 4–6, 6–3 in the final.

Seeds
All seeds receive a bye into the second round.

Draw

Finals

Top half

Section 1

Section 2

Bottom half

Section 3

Section 4

References

External links
Main draw
Qualifying draw

Torneo Internacional Challenger León - Singles
2019 Singles